The W42 was an American nuclear fission weapon developed in 1957.

In December 1957 the Army requested the Atomic Energy Commission to develop a nuclear warhead for the HAWK low- to medium-altitude surface-to-air missile. In July 1958 the military characteristics were approved for the new warhead and the design released. Two months later the requirement for a HAWK with a nuclear warhead was cancelled.

The warhead was briefly considered for the AAM-N-10 Eagle long-range air-to-air missile

The project was cancelled in June 1961.

References

Citations

Bibliography

Nuclear weapons of the United States
Military equipment introduced in the 1950s